The Kauhajoki school shooting occurred on 23 September 2008 at the Seinäjoki University of Applied Sciences (SeAMK) in Kauhajoki, Finland. The gunman, 22-year-old student Matti Juhani Saari, shot and killed ten people with a Walther P22 Target semi-automatic pistol, before shooting himself in the head. He died a few hours later at Tampere University Hospital. One woman was injured but was in a stable condition.

The shooting took place at the Kauhajoki School of Hospitality, owned by the Seinäjoki Municipal Federation of Education. The facilities and campus were shared between SeAMK and the Seinäjoki Vocational Education Centre – Sedu. Saari was a second-year student in a Hospitality Management undergraduate degree programme. The incident was the second school shooting in less than a year in Finland, the other being the Jokela school shooting in November 2007, in which nine people including the gunman died. Before that, only one other school shooting had taken place in the country's history, in Rauma in 1989, leaving two people dead.

Shooting
Matti Saari entered through the school buildings via the basement. The shooting began in a classroom at around 10:40 (UTC+3), when roughly 200 people were assembled inside the college. The emergency services received their first call at 10:46, after Saari stopped shooting in the classroom. Saari was armed with a .22 LR caliber Walther P22 Target semi-automatic firearm and homemade Molotov cocktails. He wore dark clothing including a leather jacket. The school's caretaker, Jukka Forsberg, who had several shots directed at him but survived, said "[The gunman] was very well prepared. He walked calmly."

Saari initially opened fire on a group of students taking a business studies exam, and entered at least one other classroom. According to the three students who were able to escape from the exam room (there were roughly 20 students taking the exam), he had approached his victims individually before shooting them, acting aggressively. Saari encountered little resistance and the massacre was concluded relatively quickly. He left the exam room at least once during the shooting to reload in the hallway outside and, according to witnesses, the teacher unsuccessfully attempted to prevent him from returning and was killed as a result. 

Nine victims died in the exam room and the tenth victim died in the hallway. Another student was seriously wounded in the head but survived. Saari then covered the classroom in a flammable liquid, believed to be petrol, and set the room alight. Some of the victims' bodies were damaged by the fire, making it more difficult to identify them. Eight of the victims were female students, one a male student, and one a male member of staff. All of the students killed were in their 20s, and the teacher was in his 50s. A 21-year-old woman was shot in the head but had two operations in the days after sustaining her injury, and was reported as being in a satisfactory condition. A further ten students were treated for minor injuries including sprains and cuts from broken glass. All the victims were classmates of Saari's. 

A student in an adjacent classroom, Sanna Orpana, said that her class had heard "shooting and a kind of a rumble like tables falling down." Orpana believed at the time that the noise may have been coming from a toy gun, and two other students went to investigate the noise. Saari shot at them, and the remaining students in Orpana's classroom hid under a table before running upstairs. At some point between 10:45–11:00 Saari ran down a corridor and threw a Molotov cocktail into a language laboratory. He then shot out all of the windows in the school's main corridor, which extended through the building. It was during this time that Saari also took aim at Forsberg.

A police van with two officers arrived a short time after the shootings began, at around 11:00. They entered the yard of the college, where they were shot at by Saari and forced to retreat. From around 11:45 to 12:00 further police units, bolstered by a number of armoured vehicles, began to arrive on the scene. They attempted to enter the building through the main corridor, but this assault was aborted due to the black smoke that was emanating from within the building. Meanwhile, having escaped the buildings in a variety of ways (including through doors and out of windows), some students found themselves impeded by a river that adjoined the school. However, some were able to use rowing boats as a means of escape.

Firefighters extinguished the fires without any major damage to the school. Saari remained at large for some time in the school grounds after they had been evacuated. Two days after the killings, a friend of Saari's, named Rauno, told 7 päivää that at 11:53 he received a call from Saari in which he confessed to having perpetrated the shooting. Saari is claimed to have spoken to Rauno in a calm manner, telling him that he wanted to say goodbye. He was found alive by the police at 12:13, having shot himself in the head. He was taken to Tampere University Hospital, where he was treated for his gunshot wound. He died a short time later at 16:46.

Victims 

Saari was originally from North Ostrobothnia but lived in Kauhajoki, where he was enrolled in a catering course at the college. It was later revealed that the sole male student victim was probably a close friend of Saari's. The pair had spent an evening out together in February 2008 when they were threatened with a starter pistol. A photo of them together had been circulating on the Internet, in which Saari jokingly points at his friend's head with his forefinger. The names of the other victims were withheld by police.

With a total of ten people killed, it was the deadliest peacetime attack in Finnish history, surpassing the previous highest count of eight in the Jokela school shooting. It was the deadliest attack on a school campus since April 2007, when Seung-Hui Cho killed 32 people during the Virginia Tech shooting. Saari had fired a total of nearly 200 shots, including shots into the air. The highest number of shots inflicted to a single victim was twenty.

Investigation 
Saari left behind two handwritten notes in his school dormitory indicating that he had been planning the massacre for six years. A police spokesperson commented: "Saari left notes saying he had a hatred for mankind, for the whole of the human race, and that he had been thinking about what he was going to do for years. The notes show he was very troubled and he hated everything." Police said that although most of the victims were female, the motive did not seem to be a hatred of women. One of Saari's friends noticed a change in his behaviour two years before the shootings, when Saari began expressing a fondness for guns and an admiration of school shootings in the United States. He said that around eighteen months previously Saari had sent him a message saying that he would carry out a school shooting the next day. Saari reportedly denied being serious about carrying out his threat.

Finnish police were also investigating whether a copycat element was involved after it emerged that both Saari and Pekka-Eric Auvinen, the gunman in the Jokela shooting, had bought their guns from the same store. Both gunmen had taken photographs of themselves in similar poses, and both exchanged videos related to school shootings on YouTube and Finnish social networking site IRC-Galleria. In March 2009, police ruled out contact with Auvinen, and said that he had committed his crimes alone: 200 people were interviewed during the investigation, none of whom said they knew of Saari's plans. Although there was no connection between Auvinen and Saari, it is clear that Saari was inspired and influenced by the Jokela shooting, as the two incidents were very similar. Saari is known to have started dressing and behaving similarly to Auvinen in the period between the two shootings.

Perpetrator

Matti Juhani Saari (20 May 1986 – 23 September 2008) was identified as the gunman responsible for the shooting. Saari, a Hospitality Management student at the school, was expelled from the Finnish Army in 2006, after serving for only a month, for opening fire in a woodland exercise against orders. Saari had been the victim of bullying in secondary school and dropped out of his classes for this reason. A friend of Saari also reported that he had been seeing a psychologist in the months before the shooting, and had been obsessed with guns. Saari said that he "always wanted to kill as many people as possible."

In his youth, Saari suffered from health problems. His early childhood was marked by slow growth and frequent illness. His brother died when he was 17 years old, which devastated him. He was very shy and sensitive. According to psychologist Peter Langman, Saari seems to have displayed signs of avoidant personality disorder and later possibly schizotypal personality disorder. He was a target of bullying in his school years and he suffered from anxiety, panic attacks and depression. During his month-long service in the Finnish Army, Saari was described as "weird and silent" and had difficulties fitting in. In his last years, he heavily used alcohol and was arrested for driving under the influence.

Saari had a YouTube account where he uploaded videos of him firing a handgun at a local shooting range. Among the user's account favourites was footage of the Columbine High School massacre. Finnish police had been informed about the YouTube videos in an anonymous tip-off on the Friday before the shooting. The police talked to Saari and searched his home on the day before the incident, on 22 September. They found no reason to arrest him as he held a temporary weapons permit. In August 2008, Saari had obtained a licence for the pistol used in the shooting. The police said that Saari did not have a criminal record. However, a police inspector was subsequently charged with dereliction of duty, and his court case began in September 2009.

Saari also posted another video on a Finnish social networking site, in which he points a firearm at the camera and says in English, "You will die next", followed by firing four shots in the direction of the camera. This video was not available to the police when Saari was questioned. A police spokesperson commented: "The only video we saw was where he was shooting at the range. It was only afterwards that much more information came out." Police said that Saari would have been detained if they had known about this video at the time of the questioning. Police said that they believed Saari's videos were shot by someone else, and that they were trying to identify who this person was. The Chief Investigator of the case, Jari Neulaniemi, speculated that the cameraman may have been the friend of Saari's who was murdered.

Interior Minister Anne Holmlund announced that the actions of the police would be investigated. Police Commissioner Mikko Paatero said that Finnish police would increase their monitoring of YouTube and other social networking sites, and when asked whether similar attacks could take place in the future, he replied: "I sadly fear it's possible."

Response

On the day of the incident, a crisis meeting was held with government ministers, chairs of the parliamentary groups, and police officials all in attendance. Prime Minister Matti Vanhanen described it as a "tragic day" and appealed for unity in the hope "that events like these will not happen again." A national day of mourning was declared for the following day, and Vanhanen travelled to Kauhajoki to meet with students.

Within days of the shooting, the police said they had received a sizeable number of tip-offs alerting them to suspicious photographs, videos, and comments on chat rooms. Finnish media reported that several bomb threats and other threatening messages were circulating among students nationwide in the few days after the shootings as well.

See also 

 Gun politics in Finland
 Kuopio school stabbing
 Sanna Sillanpää
 Sello mall shooting

References

External links 

 Finnish school gunman kills 10, BBC News
 Mirror of pictures and videos by Saari

2008 murders in Finland
2008 mass shootings in Europe
Deaths by firearm in Finland
School shooting
Mass murder in 2008
Mass shootings in Finland
Massacres in Finland
Murder–suicides in Finland
School killings in Finland
School massacres
School shootings in Finland
September 2008 crimes
September 2008 events in Europe
Spree shootings in Finland
Suicides by firearm in Finland
University and college shootings